North Elmham is a village and civil parish in the English county of Norfolk.
For the purposes of local government, it falls within the Elmham and Mattishall division of Norfolk County Council and the Upper Wensum ward of Breckland District Council. The village is located along the B1145 a route which runs between King's Lynn and Mundesley.

North Elmham was the site of a pre-Norman cathedral, seat of the Bishop of Elmham until 1075.

History 

The name North Elmham comes from the Old English, meaning "village where elms grow" and is first mentioned in 1035.<ref>Ekwall, E. Concise Dictionary of English Place-names</ref> Only ruins now survive of a Norman Chapel which is now looked after by English Heritage. The chapel is on the site of an earlier Anglo Saxon timber cathedral which housed the episcopal throne of the bishops of Elmham from around 672 until the episcopal see was moved to Thetford in 1071. A mid 9th-century copper-alloy hanging censer was discovered at North Elmham in 1786. The earthworks and ruins at North Elmham stewarded by English Heritage are thought to be the remains of Bishop Herbert de Losinga's late 11th-century episcopal church and the late 14th-century double-moated castle built on this by Henry le Despenser, Bishop of Norwich. Henry came from a powerful family who had strong links with the House of Plantagenet and the notorious 'favourites' of King Edward II.

To the north of the village was the Norfolk County School which on closing in the 1890s was taken over for the Watts Naval School. The fine buildings have now been demolished. The village is also the birthplace of the actor John Mills. 
The County School railway station served the school, and today is preserved by the Mid-Norfolk Railway as a small visitor centre. The village once had its own railway station, North Elmham railway station, on the line from Wymondham to Fakenham. The building still exists but is now a residential home, although the railway line remains and is under restoration to use.  A section of the line, between North Elmham and County School station, includes a permissive footpath.

North Elmham Mill, known locally as Grint Mill, had two breastshot waterwheels until the early 20th century when they were replaced by two turbines. By the 1970s the milling machinery was driven by mains electricity while the turbines were used to drive a sack hoist and two mixing machines. The mill continued to produce animal feed into the late 20th century.

 Notable residents 
 John Mills, actor, was born in the village.

See also

 South Elmham in Suffolk
 Spong Hill archaeological site

References

Other sources
 Bede, Ecclesiastical History of England
 Rainbird Clarke, R. East Anglia (London, 1960)
 White, William. History, Gazetteer, & Directory of Norfolk, (1845)
 Whitelock, Dorothy. 'The pre-Viking Church in East Anglia', Anglo-Saxon England'', 1 (1972),

External links

 History of North Elmham Chapel: English  Heritage

 
Villages in Norfolk
Civil parishes in Norfolk
Kingdom of East Anglia
Breckland District